Aeneator elegans is a species of large deepwater sea snail, a whelk, a marine gastropod mollusc in the family Buccinidae, the true whelks.

References

 Photo

Buccinidae
Gastropods of New Zealand
Gastropods described in 1917